Margaritothrips is a genus of thrips in the family Phlaeothripidae.

Species
 Margaritothrips flavus
 Margaritothrips longus
 Margaritothrips sumatrensis

References

Phlaeothripidae
Thrips
Thrips genera